Kelvin Maseko is a retired Zimbabwean football midfielder.

He spent most of his career at Railstars F.C., helping in promotion to Zimbabwe's top flight in 1997. The team was relegated after the 2006 season, and in January 2008 he moved abroad to play in Botswana.

At the youth international level he played in the 1994 COSAFA U-17 Tournament, scoring two goals.

References 

Year of birth missing (living people)
Living people
Zimbabwean footballers
Zimbabwe international footballers
Zimbabwe youth international footballers
Association football midfielders
Njube Sundowns F.C. players
Gilport Lions F.C. players
Zimbabwe Premier Soccer League players
Zimbabwean expatriate footballers
Expatriate footballers in Botswana
Zimbabwean expatriate sportspeople in Botswana